Emmett Lee Edwards (born June 6, 1952) is a former American football wide receiver in the National Football League who played for the Houston Oilers and Buffalo Bills. He played college football for the Kansas Jayhawks.

References

1952 births
Living people
American football wide receivers
Houston Oilers players
Buffalo Bills players
Kansas Jayhawks football players